Mount Blackwelder is a sharp, mainly ice-free peak in north Wilkniss Mountains, Victoria Land, rising to 2,340 m west of Vernier Valley and 10 km (6 mi) north of Pivot Peak.

Mapped by USGS from surveys and U.S. Navy aerial photographs, 1947–59. Named by US-ACAN in 1984 after Lieutenant Commander Billy G. Blackwelder, U.S. Navy, Senior Helicopter Pilot, Antarctic Development Squadron Six (VXE-6), Operation Deepfreeze, 1971–72 and 1975–77.

Mountains of Victoria Land
Scott Coast